The Men's under-23 time trial of the 2015 UCI Road World Championships took place in and around Richmond, Virginia, United States on September 21, 2015.

The gold medal was by won former junior world champion Mads Würtz Schmidt of Denmark, beating German pair Maximilian Schachmann and Lennard Kämna – the reigning junior world champion – by 12.2 and 21.02 seconds respectively.

Qualification

All National Federations were allowed to enter four riders for the race, with a maximum of two riders to start. In addition to this number, the outgoing World Champion and the current continental champions were also able to take part. The outgoing world champion Campbell Flakemore did not compete, as he was no longer eligible to contest under-23 races.

Course
The under-23 men rode two laps of the circuit.

The circuit was a technical course that went through the city of Richmond. From the start, the route headed west from downtown to Monument Avenue, a paver-lined, historic boulevard that's been named one of the "10 Great Streets in America." From there, the course made a 180-degree turn at N. Davis Avenue and continued in the opposite direction. The race then cut through the Uptown district before coming back through Virginia Commonwealth University and then crossing the James River. After a technical turnaround, the race came back across the river and worked its way through downtown Richmond, eventually heading up to ascend  on Governor Street. At the top, the riders had to take a sharp left turn onto the false-flat finishing straight,  to the finish.

Schedule
All times are in Eastern Daylight Time (UTC-4).

Participating nations
50 cyclists from 34 nations took part in the men's under-23 time trial. The number of cyclists per nation is shown in parentheses.

Final classification

References

Men's under-23 time trial
UCI Road World Championships – Men's under-23 time trial
2015 in men's road cycling